Viscoplasticity is a theory in continuum mechanics that describes the rate-dependent inelastic behavior of solids. Rate-dependence in this context means that the deformation of the material depends on the rate at which loads are applied. The inelastic behavior that is the subject of viscoplasticity is plastic deformation which means that the material undergoes unrecoverable deformations when a load level is reached.  Rate-dependent plasticity is important for transient plasticity calculations. The main difference between rate-independent plastic and viscoplastic material models is that the latter exhibit not only permanent deformations after the application of loads but continue to undergo a creep flow as a function of time under the influence of the applied load.

The elastic response of viscoplastic materials can be represented in one-dimension by Hookean spring elements.  Rate-dependence can be represented by nonlinear dashpot elements in a manner similar to viscoelasticity.  Plasticity can be accounted for by adding sliding frictional elements as shown in Figure 1. In the figure E is the modulus of elasticity, λ is the viscosity parameter and N is a power-law type parameter that represents non-linear dashpot [σ(dε/dt)= σ = λ(dε/dt)(1/N)].  The sliding element can have a yield stress (σy) that is strain rate dependent, or even constant, as shown in Figure 1c.

Viscoplasticity is usually modeled in three-dimensions using overstress models of the Perzyna or Duvaut-Lions types.  In these models, the stress is allowed to increase beyond the rate-independent yield surface upon application of a load and then allowed to relax back to the yield surface over time.  The yield surface is usually assumed not to be rate-dependent in such models.  An alternative approach is to add a strain rate dependence to the yield stress and use the techniques of rate independent plasticity to calculate the response of a material

For metals and alloys, viscoplasticity is the macroscopic behavior caused by a mechanism linked to the movement of dislocations in grains, with superposed effects of inter-crystalline gliding. The mechanism usually becomes dominant at temperatures greater than approximately one third of the absolute melting temperature. However, certain alloys exhibit viscoplasticity at room temperature (300K).  For polymers, wood, and bitumen, the theory of viscoplasticity is required to describe behavior beyond the limit of elasticity or viscoelasticity.

In general, viscoplasticity theories are useful in areas such as:
 the calculation of permanent deformations,
 the prediction of the plastic collapse of structures,
 the investigation of stability,
 crash simulations,
 systems exposed to high temperatures such as turbines in engines, e.g. a power plant,
 dynamic problems and systems exposed to high strain rates.

History
Research on plasticity theories started in 1864 with the work of Henri Tresca, Saint Venant (1870) and Levy (1871) on the maximum shear criterion.  An improved plasticity model was presented in 1913 by Von Mises which is now referred to as the von Mises yield criterion.  In viscoplasticity, the development of a mathematical model heads back to 1910 with the representation of primary creep by Andrade's law. In 1929, Norton developed a one-dimensional dashpot model which linked the rate of secondary creep to the stress.  In 1934, Odqvist generalized Norton's law to the multi-axial case.

Concepts such as the normality of plastic flow to the yield surface and flow rules for plasticity were introduced by Prandtl (1924) and Reuss (1930).   In 1932, Hohenemser and Prager proposed the first model for slow viscoplastic flow.  This model provided a relation between the deviatoric stress and the strain rate for an incompressible Bingham solid However, the application of these theories did not begin before 1950, where limit theorems were discovered.

In 1960, the first IUTAM Symposium “Creep in Structures” organized by Hoff provided a major development in viscoplasticity with the works of Hoff, Rabotnov, Perzyna, Hult, and Lemaitre for the isotropic hardening laws, and those of Kratochvil, Malinini and Khadjinsky, Ponter and Leckie, and Chaboche for the kinematic hardening laws. Perzyna, in 1963, introduced a viscosity coefficient that is temperature and time dependent. The formulated models were supported by the thermodynamics of irreversible processes and the phenomenological standpoint.  The ideas presented in these works have been the basis for most subsequent research into rate-dependent plasticity.

Phenomenology 
For a qualitative analysis, several characteristic tests are performed to describe the phenomenology of viscoplastic materials. Some examples of these tests are 
hardening tests at constant stress or strain rate,
creep tests at constant force, and
stress relaxation at constant elongation.

Strain hardening test

One consequence of yielding is that as plastic deformation proceeds, an increase in stress is required to produce additional strain. This phenomenon is known as Strain/Work hardening.  For a viscoplastic material the hardening curves are not significantly different from those of rate-independent plastic material. Nevertheless, three essential differences can be observed.
 At the same strain, the higher the rate of strain the higher the stress
 A change in the rate of strain during the test results in an immediate change in the stress–strain curve.
 The concept of a plastic yield limit is no longer strictly applicable.
The hypothesis of partitioning the strains by decoupling the elastic and plastic parts is still applicable where the strains are small, i.e.,

To obtain the stress–strain behavior shown in blue in the figure, the material is initially loaded at a strain rate of 0.1/s. The strain rate is then instantaneously raised to 100/s and held constant at that value for some time. At the end of that time period the strain rate is dropped instantaneously back to 0.1/s and the cycle is continued for increasing values of strain. There is clearly a lag between the strain-rate change and the stress response. This lag is modeled quite accurately by overstress models (such as the Perzyna model) but not by models of rate-independent plasticity that have a rate-dependent yield stress.

Creep test

Creep is the tendency of a solid material to slowly move or deform permanently under constant stresses. Creep tests measure the strain response due to a constant stress as shown in Figure 3. The classical creep curve represents the evolution of strain as a function of time in a material subjected to uniaxial stress at a constant temperature. The creep test, for instance, is performed by applying a constant force/stress and analyzing the strain response of the system. In general, as shown in Figure 3b this curve usually shows three phases or periods of behavior
 A primary creep stage, also known as transient creep, is the starting stage during which hardening of the material leads to a decrease in the rate of flow which is initially very high. .
 The secondary creep stage, also known as the steady state, is where the strain rate is constant. .
 A tertiary creep phase in which there is an increase in the strain rate up to the fracture strain. .

Relaxation test

As shown in Figure 4, the relaxation test is defined as the stress response due to a constant strain for a period of time. In viscoplastic materials, relaxation tests demonstrate the stress relaxation in uniaxial loading at a constant strain. In fact, these tests characterize the viscosity and can be used to determine the relation which exists between the stress and the rate of viscoplastic strain.  The decomposition of strain rate is 

The elastic part of the strain rate is given by

For the flat region of the strain-time curve, the total strain rate is zero.  Hence we have,

Therefore, the relaxation curve can be used to determine rate of viscoplastic strain and hence the viscosity of the dashpot in a one-dimensional viscoplastic material model.  The residual value that is reached when the stress has plateaued at the end of a relaxation test corresponds to the upper limit of elasticity.  For some materials such as rock salt such an upper limit of elasticity occurs at a very small value of stress and relaxation tests can be continued for more than a year without any observable plateau in the stress.

It is important to note that relaxation tests are extremely difficult to perform because maintaining the condition  in a test requires considerable delicacy.

Rheological models of viscoplasticity 
One-dimensional constitutive models for viscoplasticity based on spring-dashpot-slider elements include
the perfectly viscoplastic solid, the elastic perfectly viscoplastic solid, and the elastoviscoplastic hardening solid. The elements may be connected in series or in parallel. In models where the elements are connected in series the strain is additive while the stress is equal in each element. In parallel connections, the stress is additive while the strain is equal in each element. Many of these one-dimensional models can be generalized to three dimensions for the small strain regime.

Perfectly viscoplastic solid (Norton-Hoff model) 

In a perfectly viscoplastic solid, also called the Norton-Hoff model of viscoplasticity, the stress (as for viscous fluids) is a function of the rate of permanent strain.  The effect of elasticity is neglected in the model, i.e.,  and hence there is no initial yield stress, i.e., .  The viscous dashpot has a response given by

where  is the viscosity of the dashpot.  In the Norton-Hoff model the viscosity  is a nonlinear function of the applied stress and is given by

Then the viscoplastic strain rate is given by the relation

In one-dimensional form, the Norton-Hoff model can be expressed as

When  the solid is viscoelastic.

If we assume that plastic flow is isochoric (volume preserving), then the above relation can be expressed in the more familiar form

The equivalent strain rate is defined as

These models can be applied in metals and alloys at temperatures higher than two thirds of their absolute melting point (in kelvins) and polymers/asphalt at elevated temperature.  The responses for strain hardening, creep, and relaxation tests of such material are shown in Figure 6.

Elastic perfectly viscoplastic solid (Bingham–Norton model) 

Two types of elementary approaches can be used to build up an elastic-perfectly viscoplastic mode.  In the first situation, the sliding friction element and the dashpot are arranged in parallel and then connected in series to the elastic spring as shown in Figure 7.  This model is called the Bingham–Maxwell model (by analogy with the Maxwell model and the Bingham model) or the Bingham–Norton model.  In the second situation, all three elements are arranged in parallel.  Such a model is called a Bingham–Kelvin model by analogy with the Kelvin model.

For elastic-perfectly viscoplastic materials, the elastic strain is no longer considered negligible but the rate of plastic strain is only a function of the initial yield stress and there is no influence of hardening.  The sliding element represents a constant yielding stress when the elastic limit is exceeded irrespective of the strain.  The model can be expressed as

where  is the viscosity of the dashpot element.  If the dashpot element has a response that is of the Norton form

we get the Bingham–Norton model

Other expressions for the strain rate can also be observed in the literature with the general form

The responses for strain hardening, creep, and relaxation tests of such material are shown in Figure 8.

Elastoviscoplastic hardening solid
An elastic-viscoplastic material with strain hardening is described by equations similar to those for an elastic-viscoplastic material with perfect plasticity.  However, in this case the stress depends both on the plastic strain rate and on the plastic strain itself.  For an elastoviscoplastic material the stress, after exceeding the yield stress, continues to increase beyond the initial yielding point.  This implies that the yield stress in the sliding element increases with strain and the model may be expressed in generic terms as
.

This model is adopted when metals and alloys are at medium and higher temperatures and wood under high loads. The responses for strain hardening, creep, and relaxation tests of such a material are shown in Figure 9.

Strain-rate dependent plasticity models 
Classical phenomenological viscoplasticity models for small strains are usually categorized into two types:
 the Perzyna formulation
 the Duvaut–Lions formulation

Perzyna formulation 
In the Perzyna formulation the plastic strain rate is assumed to be given by a constitutive relation of the form

where  is a yield function,  is the Cauchy stress,  is a set of internal variables (such as the plastic strain ),  is a relaxation time. The notation  denotes the Macaulay brackets. The flow rule used in various versions of the Chaboche model is a special case of Perzyna's flow rule and has the form

Several models for the backstress also go by the name Chaboche model.

Duvaut–Lions formulation 
The Duvaut–Lions formulation is equivalent to the Perzyna formulation and may be expressed as

where  is the elastic stiffness tensor,  is the closest point projection of the stress state on to the boundary of the region that bounds all possible elastic stress states.  The quantity  is typically found from the rate-independent solution to a plasticity problem.

Flow stress models 
The quantity  represents the evolution of the yield surface.   The yield function  is often expressed as an equation consisting of some invariant of stress and a model for the yield stress (or plastic flow stress).  An example is von Mises or  plasticity.  In those situations the plastic strain rate is calculated in the same manner as in rate-independent plasticity.  In other situations, the yield stress model provides a direct means of computing the plastic strain rate.

Numerous empirical and semi-empirical flow stress models are used the computational plasticity.  The following  temperature and strain-rate dependent models provide a sampling of the models in current use:
the Johnson–Cook model
the Steinberg–Cochran–Guinan–Lund model.
the Zerilli–Armstrong model.
the Mechanical threshold stress model.
the Preston–Tonks–Wallace model.

The Johnson–Cook (JC) model  is purely empirical and is the most widely used of the five. However, this model exhibits an unrealistically small strain-rate dependence at high temperatures. The Steinberg–Cochran–Guinan–Lund (SCGL) model  is semi-empirical. The model is purely empirical and strain-rate independent at high strain-rates. The SCGL model is used extensively by the shock physics community. The Zerilli–Armstrong (ZA) model  is a simple physically based model that has been used extensively. A more complex model that is based on ideas from dislocation dynamics is the Mechanical Threshold Stress (MTS) model. This model has been used to model the plastic deformation of copper, tantalum, alloys of steel, and aluminum alloys. However, the MTS model is limited to strain-rates less than around 107/s. The Preston–Tonks–Wallace (PTW) model  is also physically based and has a form similar to the MTS model. However, the PTW model has components that can model plastic deformation in the overdriven shock regime (strain-rates greater that 107/s). Hence this model is valid for the largest range of strain-rates among the five flow stress models.

Johnson–Cook flow stress model
The Johnson–Cook (JC) model  is purely empirical and gives the following relation for the flow stress 

where  is the equivalent plastic strain,  is the 

The normalized strain-rate and temperature in equation (1) are defined as 

where  is the effective plastic strain-rate of the quasi-static test used to determine the yield and hardening parameters A,B and n. For conditions where , we assume that .

Steinberg–Cochran–Guinan–Lund flow stress model
The Steinberg–Cochran–Guinan–Lund (SCGL) model is a semi-empirical model that was developed by Steinberg et al. for high strain-rate situations and extended to low strain-rates and bcc materials by Steinberg and Lund.  The flow stress in this model is given by

The saturation of the thermally activated stress is the Peierls stress. The shear modulus for this model is usually computed with the Steinberg–Cochran–Guinan shear modulus model.

The strain hardening function has the form

initial equivalent plastic strain.

The thermal component is computed using a bisection algorithm from the following equation.

where  is the energy to form a kink-pair in a dislocation segment of length ,  is the Boltzmann constant,  is the Peierls stress. The constants  are given by the relations

Zerilli–Armstrong flow stress model
The Zerilli–Armstrong (ZA) model  is based on simplified dislocation mechanics.  The general form of the equation for the flow stress is

In this model,  is the athermal component of the flow stress given by

where  is the contribution due to solutes and initial dislocation density,  is the microstructural stress intensity,  is the average grain diameter,  is zero for fcc materials,  are material constants.

where  are material parameters that depend on the type of material (fcc, bcc, hcp, alloys).

Mechanical threshold stress flow stress model
The Mechanical Threshold Stress (MTS) model ) has the form

The scaling factors take the Arrhenius form

The strain hardening component of the mechanical threshold stress is given by an empirical modified Voce law

where

Note that the maximum strain-rate is usually limited to about /s.

Preston–Tonks–Wallace flow stress model
The Preston–Tonks–Wallace (PTW) model  attempts to provide a model for the flow stress for extreme strain-rates (up to 1011/s) and temperatures up to melt.  A linear Voce hardening law is used in the model.  The PTW flow stress is given by

with 

The saturation stress and the yield stress are given by

See also 
 Viscoelasticity
 Bingham plastic
 Dashpot
 Creep (deformation)
 Plasticity (physics)
 Continuum mechanics
 Quasi-solid

References 

Continuum mechanics
Plasticity (physics)